Club Paysandú Bella Vista, commonly known as Paysandú Bella Vista, is a Uruguayan football club from Paysandú. They competed in the Primera División four times.

History
The club was founded on January 11, 1939 as Bella Vista Ferroviario. at Juan Spolita's home. The club played its first game ever against Paysandú Wanderers in the same year. Paysandú Bella Vista was renamed to Atlético Bella Vista on July 3, 1973. They competed in the Primera División in 1999, 2000, 2001, 2001 and in 2002, when they were relegated to the Segunda División. The club was renamed back to Paysandú Bella Vista in 2005.

References

Association football clubs established in 1939
Sport in Paysandú
Football clubs in Uruguay
1939 establishments in Uruguay